Vubwi is a constituency of the National Assembly of Zambia. It covers Chilengo and Mkoko in Vubwi District of Eastern Province.

List of MPs

References

Constituencies of the National Assembly of Zambia
1991 establishments in Zambia
Constituencies established in 1991